The Eggenfellner E6 is a series of American aircraft engines, developed by Jan Eggenfellner and produced by Eggenfellner Aircraft of Edgewater, Volusia County, Florida for use in homebuilt aircraft between 1994 and 2009.

Design and development
Based on Subaru automotive engines, the E6 series are all six cylinder, four-stroke, horizontally-opposed, liquid-cooled, gasoline engine designs, with mechanical gearbox reduction drives with a reduction ratio of 2.02:1.

The engine series was produced from 1994 until 2009, when the company went out of business in the Great Recession.

Applications
The company's engines found a high degree of customer acceptance among owners of Van's Aircraft types, due to the completeness of the package provided and the low price. In 2003 it was reported that 298 engines had been sold to RV builders.

Other applications:
Russian Gyroplanes Gyros-1 Farmer

Variants
E6-3.0L
 engine, that produces  at 6500 rpm.
E6-3.6L
 engine, that produces  at 6000 rpm.

Specifications (E6-3.0L)

See also

References

External links
Official website archives on Archive.org

1990s aircraft piston engines